"All of the Stars" is a song by English singer-songwriter Ed Sheeran. It is featured over the credits in the 2014 film The Fault in Our Stars and is the first track of the soundtrack album, The Fault in Our Stars (Music from the Motion Picture). It is also a bonus track on the physical deluxe edition of Sheeran's second studio album x (2014).

Sheeran said that the song was "inspired by the whole movie, just wanting to be sad, yet euphoric and lift people a little bit." The film, about a teenager dying of cancer who falls in love with another teen cancer patient, deals with the importance of love in the face of death.

In 2014, Sheeran would join singer Christina Grimmie for a famous duet of the song on the season 6 finale of The Voice.

Music video
The music video was premiered on YouTube on 9 May 2014. The video does not feature any new footage from the movie, but it does feature fan-submitted messages of encouragement such as "Everything is beautiful" and "You are not a burden".

Covers
Jackie Evancho released a single and corresponding video covering the song in August 2015.

Charts

Certifications

References

2014 songs
Ed Sheeran songs
British songs
The Fault in Our Stars (film)
Songs written by Johnny McDaid
Songs written by Ed Sheeran